The 1900–01 season was the 30th season of competitive football in England.

Events
Stockport County played their first season in the football league. Blackpool also returned to the league, at the expenses of Loughborough and Luton Town.

Despite a run of four victories at the start of the season, Aston Villa finished fourth from bottom.

Tottenham Hotspur became the first and only non-League club to date, to win the FA Cup - winning 3-1 in a replay against Sheffield United of the First Division.

Honours

Notes = Number in parentheses is the times that club has won that honour. * indicates new record for competition

League tables

First Division

Second Division

References